Mylothris yulei, Yule's dotted border or the fragile dotted border, is a butterfly in the  family Pieridae. It is found in Nigeria, Cameroon, Ethiopia, the Democratic Republic of the Congo, Uganda, Kenya, Tanzania, Zambia, Malawi, Mozambique and Zimbabwe. The habitat consists of submontane and montane forests and dense woodland.

Adults are very weak flyers and are often seen visiting flowers on the margins and in open glades of the forest. They are on wing from February to September and in November.

The larvae feed on Hevea brasiliensis, Theobroma cacao and Santalales species.

Subspecies
M. y. yulei (Democratic Republic of the Congo, Kenya (east of the Rift Valley), Tanzania, Malawi, northern Zambia, Mozambique, eastern border of Zimbabwe)
M. y. amhara Ungemach, 1932 (southern Ethiopia)
M. y. bansoana Talbot, 1944 (eastern Nigeria, western Cameroon)
M. y. latimargo Joicey & Talbot, 1921 (Uganda, Kenya (west of the Rift Valley), north-western Tanzania)

References

Butterflies described in 1897
Pierini
Butterflies of Africa
Taxa named by Arthur Gardiner Butler